The 1997 WNBA season was the inaugural season for the Charlotte Sting.

Offseason

Initial Player Allocation

WNBA Draft

Regular season

Season standings

Season schedule

Player stats
Vicky Bullett ranked seventh in the WNBA in field goals with 145. 
Vicky Bullett ranked eighth in the WNBA in total rebounds with 178
Vicky Bullett was tied for sixth in the WNBA in steals with 54.
Vicky Bullett ranked third in the WNBA in blocks with 55.
Rhonda Mapp ranked third in the WNBA in Field Goal Percentage (.492)
Andrea Stinson ranked sixth in the WNBA in assists with 124.
Andrea Stinson tied for seventh in the WNBA in blocks with 21. 
Andrea Stinson ranked sixth in the WNBA in points with 439 points.
Andrea Stinson ranked second in the WNBA in field goals with 177.
Andrea Stinson ranked second in the WNBA in minutes per game with 36.1
Andrea Stinson ranked fifth in the WNBA in points per game with 15.7

Awards and honors
Vicky Bullett of Charlotte ranked third in the WNBA with 2.0 blocks per game.
Andrea Stinson of Charlotte ranked second in the WNBA with 1011 minutes played.

References

Charlotte Sting seasons
Charlotte
Charlotte Sting